"Jump to It" is a 1982 song by American recording artist Aretha Franklin. The track is from her Gold-certified 1982 album of the same name, produced by Luther Vandross. The song was written by Vandross and Marcus Miller and features background vocals performed by Vandross and Cissy Houston. The single reached No. 1 on Billboard's Hot Soul Singles chart, remaining there for four consecutive weeks.

"Jump to It" was Franklin's biggest pop hit since 1974, peaking at No. 24 on the Billboard Hot 100 chart in October 1982. The upbeat song also reached No. 4 on the Billboard dance chart. It was nominated for a Grammy Award and several American Music Awards.

Personnel
 Aretha Franklin – lead vocals
 Doc Powell – guitar
 Marcus Miller – bass, synthesizer, synthesizer and rhythm arrangements
 Yogi Horton – drums
 Errol "Crusher" Bennett – congas
 Nat Adderley, Jr. – keyboards
 Luther Vandross – backing vocals
 Brenda White – backing vocals
 Cissy Houston – backing vocals
 Fonzi Thornton – backing vocals
 Michelle Cobbs – backing vocals
 Phillip Ballou – backing vocals
 Tawatha Agee – backing vocals

Charts

Weekly charts

References

1982 singles
1982 songs
Aretha Franklin songs
Songs written by Luther Vandross
Songs written by Marcus Miller
Dance-pop songs